Lecanto High School is a secondary school in Lecanto, Florida. It is a public high school in the Citrus County School District.  The school covers grades 9-12, with approximately 1740 students and 103 faculty.  Lecanto High School also offers extensive advanced placement courses, International Baccalaureate courses,  and dual-enrollment courses in conjunction with College of Central Florida.

It serves the following communities: Lecanto, Beverly Hills, sections of Black Diamond, Citrus Hills, Citrus Springs, Hernando, Homosassa Springs, Pine Ridge, and Sugarmill Woods.

History
The school opened in 1984, and the first graduating class was in 1985.  The school is built on a  property known as the Lecanto Educational Complex.  The property is also home to CREST School, Renaissance Center, Citrus County Instructional Resource Center, Citrus County Schools Student Services offices,  Lecanto Primary School, Lecanto Middle School, and Lecanto School of Art.  Central Florida Community College was also located on the site from 1984 to 1996, when they moved onto their own campus. As of 2009, Lecanto High School is part of the International Baccalaureate program.

Classes
In the 1996-97 school year, Lecanto switched its class scheduling to a "4X4 block" type schedule.  Each student plans their schedule specifically depending on the student's goals after High school.  Schedules and curriculum are built around whether the student is planning to work directly after graduation, attend a two-year vocational program, or planning for college.  The students must also pick a major, which will focus their studies on a more specific field.

As of 2007, Lecanto High School had average FCAT scores of 314.5 in mathematics, 317 in writing, and 315 in science.  The state averages that same year were 316.25, 295.33, and 295.33 respectively.

As of the 2018 school year, Lecanto has switched back to using the seven periods scheduling Monday through Wednesday. They have added a "Power Hour", called "Panther Hour" after the school's mascot, to their schedules for clubs, chat, lunch, or social activities on Thursdays and Fridays which follow the "4X4 Block" scheduling.

Band
Made up of around 65 to 85 musicians (brass woodwind and percussion), the Lecanto High School Marching Band has been on the rise in the Florida Marching Band Coalition (FMBC) since 2009. In 2011, 2012, 2014, and 2015, they ended in the top 10 in the 2A class. Staff includes the director Bobby Crane (2016–present), visual instructor Ryan Anderson (2015–2016), color guard instructor Benjamin Schreiber (2014–present), and front ensemble instructor Hunter Brown (2016–present).

Shows and accomplishments
2009 - 2012 Superior Ratings at the Florida Bandmasters Association Music Performance Assessment 
2009, 2010 and 2012, 2015 Straight Superior at FBA MPA 
2006 Nightmare Before Christmas class 1A 13th 64.80 
2007 The Rat Pack class 1A 23rd 66.66 
2008 Of Dreams and Nightmares DNA 
2009 Kansas class 2A 18th 74.01 
2010 The Prince of Egypt class 2A 16th 77.00 
2011 Journey Home class 2A 10th 84.78 
2011 Ocala Marching Band Festival Small Bands Grand Champions 
2012 Brave the Pressure 2A 7th 83.88 
2013 Out of the Ashes 2A 12th 77.490
2014 Almost Human 2A 9th 76.15 
2015 Double Agent 2A 7th 75.85 
2016 Puppet Master 2A 12th 69.94
2017 The Tell-Tale Heart 2A 17th 72.35
2018 The Do Over Button 2A 18th 68.35

Notable alumni
Miles Teller, actor

References

Educational institutions established in 1984
High schools in Citrus County, Florida
School buildings completed in 1984
Public high schools in Florida
1984 establishments in Florida
1980s architecture in the United States